The list of North Carolina hurricanes includes 413 known tropical or subtropical cyclones that have affected the U.S. state of North Carolina. Due to its location, many hurricanes have hit the state directly, and numerous hurricanes have passed near or through North Carolina in its history; the state is ranked fourth, after Florida, Texas, and Louisiana, in the number of cyclones that produced hurricane-force winds in a U.S. state. Hurricanes in North Carolina history are responsible for over $11 billion in damage (2008 USD) and almost 1,000 total fatalities.

Climatology
As to statistical hurricane research between 1883 and 1996 by the North Carolina State Climatology Office, a tropical cyclone makes landfall along the coastline about once every four years. An estimated 17.5 percent of all North Atlantic tropical cyclones have affected the state. Additionally, the remnants of a few Pacific tropical cyclones struck the state. Cape Hatteras is most affected by storms within the state, though Cape Lookout and Cape Fear are also regularly affected; the increased activity in three areas is because it protrudes from elsewhere along the Atlantic coastline. After Southern Florida, Cape Hatteras has the lowest return period, or the frequency at which a certain intensity or category of hurricane can be expected within 86 mi (139 km) of a given location, in the country. As the Outer Banks are a narrow strip of low-lying land, hurricanes occasionally leave portions of the land partially or fully submerged. Additionally, the remnants of inland tropical cyclones have produced flooding and landslides in the state's western region.

Tropical cyclones have affected North Carolina in every month between May and December; about 35 percent of the storms struck the state in September, and 80 percent affected the state between August and October, which coincides with the peak of the hurricane season. The most recent storm to affect the state was Hurricane Florence. Florence made landfall at Wrightsville Beach on September 13, 2018. A total of 40 N.C. Residents lost their lives.  The strongest storm to strike the state was Hurricane Hazel on October 15, 1954, which made landfall as a Category 4 hurricane on the Saffir–Simpson hurricane scale.

Pre-1900

The list of North Carolina hurricanes before 1900 encompasses 139 tropical cyclones that affected the U.S. state of North Carolina. Collectively, cyclones in North Carolina during the time period resulted in over 775 direct fatalities during the period. Seven cyclones affected the state in the 1893 season, which was the year with the most tropical cyclones devastating the state during the time period. From the beginning of the official Atlantic hurricane record in 1851 to 1899, there were 12 years without a known tropical cyclone affecting the state.

Historical data prior to 1700 is sparse due to lack of significant European settlements along the coastline; the few storms listed are largely records from Roanoke Colony and later the Province of Carolina. Modern meteorologists believe early storms were tropical cyclones, though due to the time period confirmation is impossible. One theory explaining the disappearance of Roanoke Colony suggests a hurricane destroyed the village, though there is no evidence to prove the theory. It is considered unlikely due to lack of damage to a fence around the village, on which the villagers left an inscription.

1900–1949

Between 1900 and 1949, 75 tropical cyclones or their remnants affected the state. Collectively, cyclones in North Carolina during that time period resulted in 53 total fatalities during the period, as well as about $393 million in damage (2020 USD). Tropical cyclone affected the state in all but nine seasons. In the 1916 season, five storms affected the state, which was the season with the most storms devastating the state. The strongest hurricanes to affect the state during the time period were the 1933 Outer Banks hurricane and the 1944 Great Atlantic Hurricane, which produced winds of Category 3 status on the Saffir–Simpson hurricane scale within the state. The 1933 Outer Banks hurricane was the deadliest hurricane in the state during the time period, which killed 21 people. The remnants of a hurricane in 1940 dropped heavy rainfall in the state, which caused over $180 million in damage (2020 USD) from flooding and landslides.

1950–1979

A total of 79 tropical or subtropical cyclones affected North Carolina between 1950 and 1979. Collectively, cyclones during the time period resulted in 37 total fatalities during the period, as well as about $4 billion in damage (2020 USD). A cyclone affected the state in every year during the time period, and in three seasons a total of five cyclones assailed the state. The strongest hurricane to hit the state during the time period was Hurricane Hazel, which struck the state as a Category 4 hurricane on the Saffir–Simpson hurricane scale. Hazel was both the costliest and deadliest cyclone during the period, causing over $1 billion in damage (2020 USD) and 19 deaths. Most storms affected the state in September, though cyclones lashed the state between May and October.

1980–Present

The period from 1980 to the present encompasses 120 tropical or subtropical cyclones that affected the state. Collectively, cyclones in North Carolina during the time period resulted in over $10 billion in damage (2010 USD), primarily from hurricanes Fran and Floyd. Additionally, tropical cyclones in North Carolina were responsible for 77 direct fatalities and at least 44 indirect casualties during the period. Eight cyclones affected the state in the 1985 season, which was the year with the most tropical cyclones striking the state. Every year included at least one tropical cyclone affecting the state.

The strongest hurricane to hit the state during the time period was Hurricane Fran in 1996, which struck near Wilmington as a Category 3 hurricane on the Saffir–Simpson hurricane scale; Hurricane Emily in 1993 brushed the Outer Banks also as a Category 3 hurricane. Onslow County was hit on August 27, 1998, by category two Hurricane Bonnie causing heavy rains, flooding, an estimated $480 mil damage and a few deaths. The deadliest hurricane during the period was Hurricane Floyd in 1999, which caused 35 fatalities and record–breaking flooding in the eastern portion of the state. Hurricane Irene hit the Outer Banks on August 27, 2011, as a Category 1, making it the first of its kind to make landfall since Hurricane Ike in 2008. In 2018, Hurricane Florence made landfall in Wrightsville Beach as a Category 1 storm, causing catastrophic flooding across the state. Dropping almost three feet of rain, it is North Carolina's wettest hurricane. In 2019, Hurricane Dorian made landfall on Cape Hatteras as a Category 2 storm, causing large storm surges to sweep across some islands, particularly Ocracoke.

Deadly storms
The table lists hurricanes by death tolls of over 20 fatalities. Direct deaths are those that are directly caused by the storm passage, such as drownings or deaths from being struck by windblown objects. Indirect deaths, which are not included in the toll of Hurricane Floyd, are those that are related to the storm, but not directly from its storm effects. Due to lack of data, many early hurricanes have overall death tolls that do not specify indirect or direct.

See also

Climate of North Carolina
 Geography of North Carolina
 Hazard mitigation in the Outer Banks
 List of United States hurricanes
 List of wettest known tropical cyclones in North Carolina
 List of Atlantic hurricanes

References

Atlantic hurricanes
Lists of tropical cyclones in the United States
Hurricanes